Soy libre is the 11th album by Mexican pop singer Yuri. It was released on April 4, 1990. It sold over 500,000 copies earning Gold and Platinum discs. "Soy libre" means "I'm free", the title was a result of her divorce. It reached #10 in Pop Latin Albums in Billboard.

Track CD listing

Track LP listing

Track Special Edition listing

Production
 Producer: Mariano Pérez Bautista
 Production coordination: CRAB
 Recorded in: Round House (London)
 Engineer: Graham Daol
 Engineer at Sonoland (Madrid): Bob Painter
 Engineer in Somlibre (Rio de Janeiro): Ivan Carvacho
 String recorded in CTS (London) - Engineer: Isaías García
 Musical arrangements: Graham Presket, Bob Paiter, Ary Sperling, Carlos Gomez and Javier Lozada
 Musicians: Charly Morgan (Drums), Andy Pask (Bass), Niguel Jenkins (Guitar), Juan Cerro (Spanish and Electric guitars), Roger Meanda (Electric guitar on "Todo mi corazón"), Mitch Dalton and Ary Sperling (Acoustic guitars), Manolo Morales (Saxophone), Milton Guedes (Saxophone on "Todo mi corazón", Harmonica on "Olas que vienen"), Armando Marsal and Mariano Pérez (Percussions)
 Backing vocals: Group "Zarabanda", Mavi Pechis, Maisa Henz, José Falcón and Mariano Pérez
 Schedules in Madrid (Spain) by: Javier Lozada
 Programming in Brazil by: Ary Sperling
 Mixed at Sondland (Madrid) by: Mariano Pérez Bautista
 Art director: Arturo Medellín
 Graphic design: Karem Trétmanis
 Photos: Carlos Somonte
 Stylist: Gabriela D'Aque
 Make-up and Hairstyles: Alan Simancas

Singles
 Quien Eres Tu
 Sabes Lo Que Pasa
 El Apagón
 Todo Mi Corazón
 Cosas del Amor

Single Charts

References 

1990 albums
Yuri (Mexican singer) albums